The Lowbidgee Floodplain extends from Balranald to near Waradgery Station, about  west of Hay, in south-western New South Wales.  The Lowbidgee Floodplain is part of the Traditional lands of the Nari Nari and Muthi Muthi Aboriginal peoples.

It comprises an extensive (c. ) floodplain of the lower Murrumbidgee River and its tributaries, including the confluence of the Murrumbidgee with the Lachlan River, with numerous swamps and lakes. Apart from Yanga National Park (established in 2005 on the former Yanga Station) most of the floodplain consists of commercial irrigated farmland.

Birds
A  area of the floodplain, defined as the maximum area of contemporary flooding, has been identified by BirdLife International as an Important Bird Area (IBA) because it has supported up to 650,000 waterbirds during times of major flooding, and regularly supports over 1% of the world populations of black swans, freckled ducks, pink-eared ducks, grey teals, Australasian shovelers, straw-necked ibises, yellow-billed spoonbills and white-headed stilts.  Other birds that have been recorded in large numbers include whiskered terns and Eurasian coots. Reduced inundation of the floodplain, through the construction of water management works, has resulted in waterbird numbers dropping by 90%, from an average of 140,000 in 1983-86 to 14,000 in 1998-2001.

References

Important Bird Areas of New South Wales
Riverina
Floodplains of Australia
Wetlands of New South Wales